Philip Humphrey Vellacott (16 January 1907 – 24 August 1997) was an English classical scholar, known for his numerous translations of Greek tragedy.

He was born at Grays, Essex and educated at St Paul's School, London and Magdalene College, Cambridge, where he was awarded a double first in the Classics Tripos.

During the 1930s, Vellacott taught at Liverpool University, and schools including Dulwich College, London. He carried on teaching through the Second World War, as he was a conscientious objector. It was during his time as a teacher that he completed most of his Penguin Books classical translations centred on the works of Aeschylus, Euripides and Theophrastus.

Vellacott lectured on Greek drama on four tours in the US and spent time as a visiting lecturer at the University of California at Santa Cruz. He retired in 1967 to Radnorshire, where he carried on writing until his death in 1997.

In 1939 he married Nancy Agnew. The artist Elisabeth Vellacott was his sister.

Works, other than translations
Ordinary Latin (1962)
Writing in Latin (1970), with D. P. Simpson 
Sophocles and Oedipus: a Study of Oedipus Tyrannus with a New Translation (1971)
Ironic drama: a Study of Euripides' method and meaning (1975)
The Logic of Tragedy: Morals and Integrity in Aeschylus' Oresteia (1984)
The English Reader's Guide to Sophocles' Two Oedipus Plays (1993)

Translations
Aeschylus: The Oresteian Trilogy (Agamemnon, The Choephori, The Eumenides) (1956)
Aeschylus: Prometheus Bound and other plays (Prometheus Bound, The Suppliants, Seven Against Thebes, The Persians) (1961)
Euripides: Alcestis and other plays (Hippolytus, Iphigenia in Tauris, Alcestis) (1953) (republished as Three Plays (1972))
Euripides: The Bacchae and other plays (Ion, The Women of Troy, Helen, The Bacchae) (1954)
Euripides: Medea and other plays (Medea, Hecabe, Electra, Heracles) (1963)
Euripides: Orestes and other plays (The Children of Heracles, Andromache, The Suppliant Women, The Phoenician Women, Orestes, Iphigenia in Aulis) (1972)
Theophrastus: The Characters, and Menander: Plays and Fragments (1967)

References

External links
Schmiel, Robert "Review of Ironic Drama: A Study of Euripides' Method and Meaning by Philip Vellacott" The American Journal of Philology Vol. 97, No. 2 (Summer, 1976), pp. 183–185

1907 births
1997 deaths
People from Grays, Essex
People educated at St Paul's School, London
Alumni of Magdalene College, Cambridge
English classical scholars
Academics of the University of Liverpool
Greek–English translators
20th-century translators
Translators of Ancient Greek texts